The 2005 World Series of Poker Circuit is the first annual World Series of Poker Circuit.

Event schedule
The following events took place in the build-up to the 2005 World Series of Poker. The money finishers in each event qualified for the World Series of Poker Tournament of Champions. The buy-in for the 2005 events was $10,000.

All tournaments were broadcast as a part of the ESPN coverage of the 2005 WSOP. The first tournament was split over two episodes.

Notes 

World Series of Poker Circuit
2005 in poker